Charles Dillon may refer to:
Charles Dillon (actor-manager) (1819–1881), English actor-manager
Charles Dillon, 10th Viscount Dillon
Charles Dillon, 12th Viscount Dillon (1745–1813), Member of Parliament for Westbury, 1770
Charles Dillon, 14th Viscount Dillon (1810–1865)
Charles Dillon (designer) (died 1982), British designer
Charles Hall Dillon (1853–1929), member of the United States House of Representatives
Charles Dillon (American football) (born 1986), American football player
Charles Dillon (administrator), see List of administrators of the French protectorate of Annam

See also
Viscount Dillon

Dillon (surname)